Feroxyhyte is an oxide/hydroxide of iron, δ-Fe3+O(OH).  Feroxyhyte crystallizes in the hexagonal system. It forms as brown rounded to concretionary masses. Feroxyhyte is opaque, magnetic, has a yellow streak, and has a relative density of 4.2.

It occurs in manganese-iron nodules on the Atlantic and Pacific Ocean floors. It is also found in the Baltic, White, and Kara Seas. Forms under high pressure conditions and reverts to goethite on exposure to surface conditions. It also occurs as cement and coatings on clasts in poorly drained soils and sediments, formed by the rapid oxidation of iron(II) oxide compounds.

It was first described in 1976 for an occurrence in soils at its type locality: Kolomyya, Ivano-Frankivsk Oblast, Ukraine.

References

Hydroxide minerals
Iron(III) minerals
Hexagonal minerals